Hyacinthe "Hy" Guèvremont (January 22, 1892 – July 7, 1964) was a Canadian professional ice hockey player. He played with the Montreal Canadiens of the National Hockey Association in the 1912–13 season, appearing in two games.

Guèvremont was married, in 1916, to the writer Germaine Guèvremont.

References

External links
Hyacinthe Guevremont at JustSportsStats

1892 births
1964 deaths
Canadian ice hockey right wingers
Ice hockey people from Quebec
Montreal Canadiens (NHA) players
Sportspeople from Trois-Rivières